Bhiria Road railway station is located in Bhiria road city, Naushahro Feroze district of Sindh province, Pakistan.

See also
 List of railway stations in Pakistan
 Pakistan Railways

References

External links

Railway stations in Naushahro Feroze District
Railway stations on Karachi–Peshawar Line (ML 1)